Gilberto Raúl Jiménez Narváez (born 4 February 1973) is a Mexican former footballer. He played in three matches for the Mexico national football team from 1997 to 2000. He was also part of Mexico's squad for the 1997 Copa América tournament.

References

External links
 

1973 births
Living people
Mexican footballers
Mexico international footballers
Association football defenders
Club Puebla players
Atlante F.C. footballers
Cruz Azul footballers
Club Nacional de Football players
Deportivo Toluca F.C. players
Liga MX players
Uruguayan Primera División players
Mexican expatriate footballers
Mexican expatriate sportspeople in Uruguay
Expatriate footballers in Uruguay
Footballers from Mexico City